Ernst Wilhelm "Wim" Wenders (born 14 August 1945) is a German filmmaker, playwright, author, and photographer. He is a major figure in New German Cinema. Among many honors, he has received three nominations for the Academy Award for Best Documentary Feature: for Buena Vista Social Club (1999), about Cuban music culture; Pina (2011), about the contemporary dance choreographer Pina Bausch; and The Salt of the Earth (2014), about Brazilian photographer Sebastião Salgado.

One of Wenders's earliest honors was a win for the BAFTA Award for Best Direction for his narrative drama Paris, Texas (1984), which also won the Palme d'Or at the 1984 Cannes Film Festival. Many of his subsequent films have also been recognized at Cannes, including Wings of Desire (1987), for which he won the Best Director Award at the 1987 Cannes Film Festival.

Wenders has been the president of the European Film Academy in Berlin since 1996. Alongside filmmaking, he is an active photographer, emphasizing images of desolate landscapes. He is considered an auteur director.

Early life
Wenders was born in Düsseldorf into a traditionally Catholic family. His father, Heinrich Wenders, was a surgeon. The Dutch name "Wim" is a shortened version of the baptismal name "Wilhelm". As a boy, Wenders took unaccompanied trips to Amsterdam to visit the Rijksmuseum. He graduated from high school in Oberhausen in the Ruhr area. He then studied medicine at the University of Freiburg (1963–64) and philosophy at the University of Dusseldorf (1964–65), but dropped out and moved to Paris in October 1966 in order to become a painter. Wenders failed his entry test at France's national film school, IDHEC (now La Fémis), and instead became an engraver at Johnny Friedlaender's studio in Montparnasse. During this time Wenders became fascinated with cinema, and saw up to five movies a day at the local movie theater.

Set on making his obsession his life's work, he returned to Germany in 1967 to work in the Düsseldorf office of United Artists. That fall, he entered the University of Television and Film Munich (HFF). Between 1967 and 1970, while at the HFF, he also worked as a film critic for FilmKritik, the Munich daily newspaper Süddeutsche Zeitung, Twen magazine, and Der Spiegel.

Wenders completed several short films before graduating from the Hochschule with a 16mm black-and-white film, Summer in the City (1970), his feature directorial debut.

Career
Wenders's career began in the late 1960s, the New German Cinema era. Much of the distinctive cinematography in his movies is the result of a long-term collaboration with Dutch cinematographer Robby Müller. Paris, Texas and Wings of Desire were the result of collaborations with avant-garde authors Sam Shepard and Peter Handke. Handke's novel The Goalie's Anxiety at the Penalty Kick was adapted for Wenders's second feature film, The Goalkeeper's Fear of the Penalty. Handke co-wrote the script for Wings of Desire.

Wenders has directed several highly acclaimed documentaries, most notably Buena Vista Social Club (1999), about Cuban musicians, and The Soul of a Man (2003), on American blues. He also directed a documentary-style film on the Skladanowsky brothers, known in English as A Trick of the Light. The Skladanowsky brothers were inventing "moving pictures" when several others like the Lumière brothers and William Friese-Greene were doing the same. Buena Vista Social Club and his documentaries on Pina Bausch, Pina, and Sebastiao Salgado, The Salt of the Earth, received nominations for the Academy Award for Best Documentary Feature.

Wenders has also directed many music videos for groups such as U2 and Talking Heads, including "Stay (Faraway, So Close!)" and "Sax and Violins". His television commercials include a UK advertisement for Carling Premier Canadian beer.

Wenders's book Emotion Pictures, a collection of diary essays written as a film student, was adapted and broadcast as a series of plays on BBC Radio 3, featuring Peter Capaldi as Wenders, with Gina McKee, Saskia Reeves, Dennis Hopper, Harry Dean Stanton and Ricky Tomlinson, dramatised by Neil Cargill.

In 2015, Wenders collaborated with artist/journalist and longtime friend Melinda Camber Porter on a documentary feature about his body of work, Wim Wenders – Visions on Film, when Porter died. The film remains incomplete.

Wenders is a member of the advisory board of World Cinema Foundation. The project was founded by Martin Scorsese and aims to find and reconstruct world cinema films that have been neglected. As of 2015 he served as a Jury Member for the digital studio Filmaka, a platform for undiscovered filmmakers to show their work to industry professionals.

In 2011, Wenders was selected to stage the 2013 cycle of Richard Wagner's Der Ring des Nibelungen at the Bayreuth Festival. The project fell through when he insisted on filming in 3-D, which the Wagner family found too costly and disruptive.

In 2012, while promoting his 3-D dance film Pina, Wenders told the Documentary channel Blog that he had begun work on a new 3-D documentary about architecture. He also said he would only work in 3-D from then on. Wenders had admired the dance choreographer Pina Bausch since 1985, but only with the advent of digital 3-D cinema did he decide that he could sufficiently capture her work on screen.

In June 2017, Wenders stage-directed Georges Bizet's opera Les Pêcheurs de perles, starring Olga Peretyatko and Francesco Demuro and conducted by Daniel Barenboim at the Berlin State Opera (Staatsoper).

In a 2018 interview, Wenders said his favorite movie of all time was his film about Pope Francis, and that his entire career had been building up to it. His admiration for Francis is profound; he said he felt Francis is doing his best in a world full of calamities. He also said that, though raised Catholic, he had converted to Protestantism years earlier.

In 2019 Wenders acted as executive producer for his former assistant director Luca Lucchesi's documentary A Black Jesus, which has similar themes to Pope Francis: A Man of His Word. The film explores the role of religion in communal identity and how this can create or dissolve differences in a small Sicilian town during the height of the refugee crisis. Lucchesi noted that Wenders pushed the film to be more symbolic and philosophical, saying that Wenders wanted the film to have a "universal fairy-tale aspect" and to represent "Europe in a nutshell."

Photography
Wenders has worked with photographic images of desolate landscapes and themes of memory, time, loss, nostalgia and movement. He began his long-running project "Pictures from the Surface of the Earth" in the early 1980s and pursued it for 20 years. The initial photographic series was titled "Written in the West" and was produced while Wenders criss-crossed the American West in preparation for his film Paris, Texas (1984). It became the starting point for a nomadic journey across the globe, including Germany, Australia, Cuba, Israel and Japan, to take photographs capturing the essence of a moment, place or space.

Legacy and honors
Wenders has received many awards, including the Golden Lion for The State of Things at the Venice Film Festival (1982); the Palme d'Or at the 1984 Cannes Film Festival for his movie Paris, Texas; and Best Direction for Wings of Desire in the 1987 Bavarian Film Awards and the 1987 Cannes Film Festival. He won the Bavarian Film Awards for Best Director for Faraway, So Close! in 1993. In 2004, he received the Master of Cinema Award of the International Filmfestival Mannheim-Heidelberg. He was awarded the Leopard of Honour at the Locarno International Film Festival in 2005. In 2012, his dance film Pina was nominated for the Best Documentary Feature of the 84th Academy Awards. Wenders also received a nomination for the Writers Guild of America Award for Best Documentary Screenplay for the film.

He has been awarded honorary doctorates by the Sorbonne in Paris in 1989, the University of Fribourg (Switzerland) in 1995 and the Université Catholique de Louvain, Belgium in 2005.

The Wim Wenders Foundation was established in Düsseldorf in 2012. The foundation provides a framework to bring together his cinematic, photographic, artistic and literary works in his native country and to make it permanently accessible to the public.

Wenders was awarded the Honorary Golden Bear at the 65th Berlin International Film Festival in February 2015. In 2016, Wenders received the Großer Kulturpreis of the Sparkassen Culture-Foundation Rhineland, one of the highest-endowed cultural honorings in Germany, with previous winners such as photographer legend Hilla Becher, sculptor Tony Cragg, musician Wolfgang Niedecken and director Sönke Wortmann. In 2017, Wenders received the Douglas Sirk Award at the Hamburg Film Festival.

Personal life
Wenders lives and works in Berlin with his wife, Donata. He has lived in Berlin since the mid-1970s. He is an ecumenical Christian; as a teenager he wished to become a Catholic priest. He supports German football club Borussia Dortmund.

In 2009, Wenders signed a petition in support of director Roman Polanski, who had been detained while traveling to a film festival in relation to his 1977 sexual abuse charges, which the petition argued would undermine the tradition of film festivals as a place for works to be shown "freely and safely" and argued that arresting filmmakers traveling to neutral countries could open the door to "actions of which no-one can know the effects."

Filmography

Films

Music videos and commercials

Other film work

Selected exhibitions

1986–1992
Written in the West, in conjunction with the publication, Written in the West, Munich: Schirmer/Mosel (1987), touring exhibition: Centre Georges Pompidou, Paris (1986); Encontros de Fotografia, Coimbra (1987); Palazzo della Triennale di Milano (1988); Film Society of Miami (1988); Goethe Institut, Stockholm (1988); Goethe Institut, Copenhagen (1988); Saint-Yrieix-La-Perche (1990); Städtische Galerie Schwarzes Kloster, Freiburg (Breisgau) (1992)

1989–1994
Wim Wenders Photographs, touring exhibition: Galerie F. C Gundlach, Hamburg (1989); Galerie Marie-Louise Wirth, Zürich (1990); Hochschule für Fernsehen und Film, Munich (1991); Fahey/Klein Gallery, Los Angeles (1991); Shibuya Seibu Dept. Store, Tokyo (1992); Kiyomizu
Temple, Kyoto (1992); Musée de l'Élysée, Lausanne (1992); Amerika Haus, Berlin (1992); Venice Biennale (1993); Louisiana Museum of Modern Art, Humlebaek (1993); Sala Parpallo Palau Dels Scala, Valencia (1994); San Telmo Museum, San Sebastian (1994)

1993–1995
Wim Wenders Photo Exhibition, in conjunction with the publication, Once, Munich: Schirmer/ Mosel (2001), touring exhibition: Palazzo delle Esposizioni, Rome (1993); Villa delle Rose, Bologna (1994); FNAC, Paris (1994); Parco, Tokyo (1994); FNAC, Berlin (1995); Villa Rufolo, Ravello (1995)

1995
Wim Wenders: Landscape and Memory, Gallery of Contemporary Photography, Santa Monica, California

1996
Wim Wenders: Landscape and Memory, Gallery of Contemporary Photography, Santa Monica
Wim Wenders: Photos, in conjunction with the publication, Wim Wenders: Photos, Munich Goethe Institute (1996), Goethe Institutes worldwide

2000
Buena Vista Social Club, Rose Gallery, Bergamot Station, Santa Monica, California

2000–2004
Pictures from the Surface of the Earth, touring exhibition: Hamburger Bahnhof, Berlin (2001), Guggenheim Museum, Bilbao (2002), Haunch of Venison, London (2003); Museum of Contemporary Art, Sydney (2003); City Art Gallery, Wellington, New Zealand; Millennium Art Museum, Beijing, China; Shanghai Museum of Art, Shanghai, China; Guangdong Museum of Art, Guangzhou, China (2004)

2003
Wim Wenders, James Cohan Gallery, New York
Wim Wenders, Galerie Judin Belot, Zurich, Switzerland

2004
Pictures from the Surface of the Earth, Australia and Japan, James Cohan Gallery, New York
Between The Lines, group exhibition, James Cohan Gallery, New York
Images of Time and Place: Contemporary Views of Landscape, group exhibition, Lehman College Art Gallery, Bronx, New York
Wim Wenders, Galleria Marabini, Bologna, Italy
Through the Lens: Eight Photographers, group exhibition, C. Grimaldis Gallery, Baltimore, Maryland.

2004–2005
Pictures from the Surface of the Earth, ARoS Aarhus Kunstmuseum, Aarhus C, Denmark

2005
The Forest: Politics, Poetics, and Practice, Nasher Museum of Art at Duke University, Durham, North Carolina
Through the Lens, group exhibition, C. Grimaldis Gallery, Baltimore, Maryland

2006
Wim Wenders: Immagini dal pianeta terra, Scuderie del Quirinale, Rome, Italy
Journey to Onomichi – Photos by Wim and Donata Wenders, Omotesando Hills, Tokyo, Japan
Pictures from the Surface of the Earth, images from touring exhibition, Salon of the Museum of Contemporary Art, Belgrade, Serbia
Dark Places, curated by Joshua Decter, Santa Monica Museum of Art, Santa Monica, California

2010
Places, strange and quiet, Museu de Arte de São Paulo, São Paulo, BR

2011
Places, strange and quiet, Haunch of Venison, London, UK

2012
Places Strange and Quiet, Ostlicht. Galerie Für Fotografie, Vienna, AT
Places, strange and quiet, Harald Falckenberg Exhibition Space, Deichtorhallen, Hamburg, DE
Wim Wenders: Pictures from the Surface of the Earth, Multimedia Art Museum, Moscow, RU

2013
Wim Wenders. Appunti di Viaggio. Armenia Giappone Germani. Villa Pignatelli, Naples, IT
Wim Wenders: Photographs, Fundació Sorigué, Leida, ES

2014
Wim Wenders: Places Strange & Quiet, GL Strand, Copenhagen, DK
Wim Wenders: Urban Solitude, Palazzo Incontro, Rome, IT

2015
Wim Wenders: America, Villa e collezione la Panza, Varese, IT
Wim Wenders: 4REAL & TRUE2. Wim Wenders. Landscapes and Photographs, Museum Kunstpalast, Düsseldorf, DE
"time capsules. by the side of the road. Wim Wenders' recent photographs", BlainSouthern, Berlin, DE
"In broad daylight even the sounds shine. Wim Wenders scouting in Portugal", curated by Anna Duque y González and Laura Schmidt Reservatório da Mãe d'Água das Amoreiras, Lisbon

2016
"The Space Between the Characters Can Carry the Load", Collection Ivo Wessel, Weserburg Museum for modern Art, Bremen, DE

2017/2018
"Instant Stories/Wim Wenders' Polaroids", The Photographers' Gallery, London, from 20 October 2017 to 11 February 2018.

Installation art

2019 
(E)motion

2020 
Two or Three Things I Know About Edward Hopper

2022 
Presence

Selected bibliography

See also
 BlainSouthern
 James Cohan Gallery
 Jerusalem 2111

References

Further reading

External links

 
 
 Senses of Cinema: Great Directors Critical Database
 filmportal.de including biography, filmography and photos
 Wim Wenders — Film — The Guardian

 
1945 births
Best Director BAFTA Award winners
Best Director German Film Award winners
Buena Vista Social Club
Cannes Film Festival Award for Best Director winners
Commandeurs of the Ordre des Arts et des Lettres
Directors of Palme d'Or winners
Directors of Golden Lion winners
English-language film directors
European Film Award for Best Director winners
German Christians
German expatriates in the United States
Film people from Düsseldorf
German film directors
German music video directors
Photographers from North Rhine-Westphalia
German theatre directors
20th-century German photographers
21st-century German photographers
20th-century German male writers
21st-century German male writers
Honorary Golden Bear recipients
Knights Commander of the Order of Merit of the Federal Republic of Germany
Kristián Award winners
Living people
Members of the Order of Merit of North Rhine-Westphalia
Recipients of the Order of Merit of Berlin
Recipients of the Pour le Mérite (civil class)
University of Television and Film Munich alumni
Postmodernist filmmakers